PTLD is an abbreviation that may refer to:
PTLD (gene)
 Pseudo top-level domain, in computer network nomenclature
 Post-transplant lymphoproliferative disorder, types of lymphomas affecting transplant patients